Good Morning Story is the seventh album by Holger Czukay, released in 1999 through Tone Casualties.

Track listing

Personnel 
Holger Czukay – vocals, guitar, bass guitar, sampler, synthesizer, production
Ursula Kloss – design, illustrations
U-She – vocals

References

External links 
 

1999 albums
Holger Czukay albums